Somerset Passenger Solutions is a bus and coach operator in Somerset, England. It is a subsidiary of FirstGroup.

History
Somerset Passenger Solutions commenced operating staff and community services in 2016 during the construction of EDF Energy's Hinkley Point C nuclear power station. The contract is scheduled to run until 2025 and at its peak will require 160 buses.

It was a 50/50 joint venture between First Group's Buses of Somerset and JJP Holdings South West's Southern National, owned by former Crosville Motor Services proprietor Jonathan Jones-Pratt. Southern National's name is revived from that of a former National Bus Company subsidiary. Its operation was not affected by the April 2018 cessation of Crosville. In October 2021 Buses of Somerset took 100% ownership.

Fleet
In January 2021 the Somerset Passenger Solutions fleet consisted of 131 vehicles, primarily Wright StreetDeck double-decker buses, Alexander Dennis Enviro200 MMC single-decker buses and Chinese-built Yutong coaches that were all purchased new by SPS between 2016 and 2019. By October 2021 it had grown to 156 vehicles.

References

External links

Bus operators in Somerset
FirstGroup
Transport companies established in 2016
2016 establishments in England